David Wells (born May 2, 1995) is an American football tight end for the Tampa Bay Buccaneers of the National Football League (NFL). He played college football at San Diego State.

Professional career

Dallas Cowboys
Wells signed with the Dallas Cowboys as an undrafted free agent on May 1, 2018. He was waived on September 1, 2018, as part of final roster cuts.

Kansas City Chiefs
Wells was signed to the Kansas City Chiefs practice squad on September 18, 2018. He remained on the practice squad for the rest of the 2018 season and signed a reserve/futures contract with the team shortly after the season ended. Wells was waived by the Chiefs with an injury designation on August 9, 2019.

New England Patriots
Wells was signed by the New England Patriots to their practice squad on November 10, 2020. He was released by the Patriots on November 16, 2020. Wells was re-signed by the Patriots on July 23, 2021. He was waived on August 15, 2021.

Atlanta Falcons
Wells was signed by the Atlanta Falcons on August 20, 2021. He was waived during final roster cuts on August 31, 2021, but was signed to the team's practice squad the next day. Wells was released on September 14, 2021.

Indianapolis Colts
Wells was signed to the Indianapolis Colts practice squad on September 28, 2021. He was released by the Colts on October 5, 2021.

Arizona Cardinals
Wells was signed to the Arizona Cardinals practice squad on October 20, 2021. He was signed to the Cardinals' active roster on November 6, 2021. He was placed on injured reserve on November 11 with a hand injury. He was activated on December 20, then waived the next day and re-signed to the practice squad. He signed a reserve/future contract with the Cardinals on January 19, 2022. He was released on July 29, 2022.

Tennessee Titans
On August 13, 2022, Wells signed with the Tennessee Titans. He was waived on August 30, 2022 and signed to the practice squad the next day. He was released on September 1.

Tampa Bay Buccaneers
On September 14, 2022, Wells was signed to the Tampa Bay Buccaneers practice squad. He was released on September 26, but re-signed on October 19. He signed a reserve/future contract on January 17, 2023.

References

External links
San Diego State Aztecs bio
Arizona Cardinals bio

1995 births
Living people
Players of American football from California
American football tight ends
San Diego State Aztecs football players
Sportspeople from Clovis, California
Arizona Cardinals players
Dallas Cowboys players
Kansas City Chiefs players
New England Patriots players
Atlanta Falcons players
Indianapolis Colts players
Tennessee Titans players
Tampa Bay Buccaneers players